Csaba Csizmadia (born 30 May 1985) is a Romanian-born Hungarian football manager and former player who played as a defender.

International career 
He represented Hungary in 12 games including 7 games for the UEFA Euro 2008 qualifying campaign.

He was member of the Székely Land squad that finished 3rd at 2017 ConIFA European Football Cup and 4th at the 2018 ConIFA World Football Cup respectively.

Managerial career 
He worked as a manager for Budafoki MTE from 2018 to 2021. In the 2019–2020 season the club was promoted to Nemzeti Bajnokság I. This was the first time after 74 years that the club reached the top flight of Hungarian football. He resigned from his job on 24 April 2021 following a 2–9 defeat against Paksi FC.

Honours
Fehérvár
Magyar Kupa: 2005–06

References

External links
 Csaba Csizmadia at magyarfutball.hu 
 

1985 births
Living people
Sportspeople from Târgu Mureș
Hungarian footballers
Romanian sportspeople of Hungarian descent
Romanian footballers
Hungary international footballers
Kecskeméti TE players
Fehérvár FC players
SV Mattersburg players
F.C. Grosseto S.S.D. players
NK Slaven Belupo players
Ferencvárosi TC footballers
Gyirmót FC Győr players
Lombard-Pápa TFC footballers
Nemzeti Bajnokság I players
Serie B players
Croatian Football League players
Hungarian expatriate footballers
Expatriate footballers in Austria
Expatriate footballers in Italy
Expatriate footballers in Croatia
Hungarian expatriate sportspeople in Austria
Hungarian expatriate sportspeople in Italy
Hungarian expatriate sportspeople in Croatia
Nemzeti Bajnokság II players
Association football defenders
Hungarian football managers
Nemzeti Bajnokság I managers